Alexander Steen Olsen (born 18 August 2001) is a Norwegian World Cup alpine ski racer.

Career
During his World Cup career, he has achieved five finishes in the top ten.

World Cup results

Season standings

Top ten results
 1 win (1 SL)
 1 podium (1 SL) , 6 top tens (4 SL, 2 GS)

World Championship results

References

External links
 
 

2001 births
Living people
Norwegian male alpine skiers